The 1959 Dartmouth Indians football team was an American football team that represented Dartmouth College during the 1959 NCAA University Division football season. After winning the Ivy League championship in 1958, Dartmouth finished second in 1959.

In their fifth season under head coach Bob Blackman, the Indians compiled a 5–3–1 record and outscored opponents 106 to 96. William Gundy was the team captain.

The Indians' 5–1–1 conference record was the second-best in the Ivy League. They outscored Ivy opponents 76 to 40. 

Dartmouth played its home games at Memorial Field on the college campus in Hanover, New Hampshire.

Schedule

References

Dartmouth
Dartmouth Big Green football seasons
Dartmouth Indians football